Impossible Object, later released as Story of a Love Story, is a 1973 drama film starring Alan Bates and Dominique Sanda. It was directed by John Frankenheimer with a screenplay by Nicholas Mosley based on his own novel. It was screened at the 1973 Cannes Film Festival, but was not entered into the main competition. Mosley wrote the screenplay at the behest of director Joseph Losey, whose film Accident was based on an earlier Mosley novel. Dirk Bogarde and Catherine Deneuve had been attached to the film. However, Losey had difficulty financing the film and later fell out with Mosley over The Assassination of Trotsky. Frankenheimer, looking to make an independent film, took over the project.

Cast
 Alan Bates as Harry
 Dominique Sanda as Natalie
 Michel Auclair as Georges
 Evans Evans as Elizabeth
 Paul Crauchet
 Lea Massari as Woman
 Sean Bury
 Henry Czarniak
 Mark Dightam
 Vernon Dobtcheff
 Isabelle Giraud-Carrier
 Michael McVey
 Laurence de Monaghan as Cleo
 André Rouille

Production
Principal photography for this movie was delayed until Dominique Sanda gave birth to her son (in April 1972). John Frankenheimer shot footage of a pregnant and naked Sanda, which was used in the movie when her character Nathalie, Harry's mistress, is pregnant with his child.

Reception
The film was a financial failure. Frankenheimer later said it was never properly released because the producers went bankrupt. However, the film saw some success at the 1974 Atlanta Film Festival, where it won the Grand Award Gold Phoenix for best film. Mosley also won for best screenplay and composer Michel Legrand for his film score. Frankenheimer said he entered the film with a stolen print.

References

External links

L'impossible objet at Festival de Cannes

1973 films
1973 drama films
French drama films
Italian drama films
1970s English-language films
Films directed by John Frankenheimer
English-language French films
English-language Italian films
1970s Italian films
1970s French films